The Illinois Department of Public Health (IDPH) is the code department of the Illinois state government that prevents and controls disease and injury, regulates medical practitioners, and promotes sanitation.

IDPH offices
The Illinois Department of Public Health consists of these offices:

 Office of the Director
 Office of Finance and Administration
 Office of Health Care Regulation
 Office of Health Promotion
 Office of Health Protection
 Office of Human Resources
 Office of Information Technology
 Office of Performance Management
 Office of Policy, Planning, and Statistics
 Office of Preparedness and Response
 Office of Women's Health

Notable people

 Catherine Stokes, is a retired deputy director of the Illinois Department of Public Health and a community volunteer.

See also
 COVID-19 pandemic in Illinois
 2019–2020 vaping lung illness outbreak
 2003 Midwest monkeypox outbreak

References

External links

 

Medical and health organizations based in Illinois
Public Health
State departments of health of the United States